Anders Holmertz (born 1 December 1968) is a Swedish retired swimmer who was a leader in freestyle (200 and 400 meters) races in the 1980s and at the beginning of the 1990s, though often missing personal success. He also settled a record in the 400 m freestyle. He is the brother of another Swedish swimmer, Mikael Holmertz.

His first appearance at Olympic Games is in 1984 at Los Angeles, at the age of sixteen. Holmertz missed the final of 200 m freestyle, with the time of 1:51.70. He scored his first international medal at the European Championships of Sofia one year later, arriving 3rd in the 4×200 m freestyle relay.

Homertz's achieved his main success at the next edition of European Championship, winning 200 m freestyle with the time of 1:48.44, beating rising Italian star Giorgio Lamberti. At Seoul he was the favourite in this race but surprisingly finished second behind Duncan Armstrong. Also a relative failure was the next European Championship, where Holmertz was only third in the 200 m freestyle.

After a series of fourth places, he trained well for the 1992 Summer Olympics. After a startling battery series, Holmertz was second in the 200 m behind the Russian surprise Yevgeny Sadovyi and third in the 400 m, again beat by Sadovyi and by Kieren Perkins. Holmertz won another silver medal in 4×200 m freestyle relay, the best result ever for his national team.

At the 1993 European Championship Holmertz won bronze medal in the 200 m and silver medal in the 400 m, both in freestyle. At the 1994 World Championship in Rome Holmertz finally won a gold medal, in the 4×200 m freestyle, plus a solo second place in the 200 m. His last success was a silver medal in the 4×200 m freestyle relay at Atlanta in 1996, after a 5th place in the 200 m solo race.

Personal bests

Long course (50 m)

Short course (25 m)

Titles

FINA World Aquatics Championships
1994 World Aquatics Championships: 4 × 200 m freestyle

European LC Championships
European LC Championships 1987: 200 m freestyle

European Junior Swimming Championships
1983 European Junior Swimming Championships: 1500 m freestyle

Swedish Swimming Championships
1984 Swedish Swimming Championships: 200 m freestyle, 400 m freestyle, 800 m freestyle, 1500 m freestyle
1985 Swedish Swimming Championships: 200 m freestyle, 400 m freestyle, 800 m freestyle, 1500 m freestyle
1986 Swedish Swimming Championships: 200 m freestyle, 400 m freestyle, 800 m freestyle, 1500 m freestyle
1987 Swedish Swimming Championships: 400 m freestyle
1988 Swedish Swimming Championships: 200 m freestyle, 400 m freestyle
1989 Swedish Swimming Championships: 200 m freestyle, 400 m freestyle
1990 Swedish Swimming Championships: 200 m freestyle, 400 m freestyle
1991 Swedish Swimming Championships: 100 m freestyle, 200 m freestyle, 400 m freestyle, 1500 m freestyle
1992 Swedish Swimming Championships: 200 m freestyle, 400 m freestyle
1993 Swedish Swimming Championships: 100 m freestyle, 200 m freestyle, 400 m freestyle, 200 m individual medley, 4 × 200 m freestyle, 4 × 100 m medley
1994 Swedish Swimming Championships: 100 m freestyle, 200 m freestyle, 400 m freestyle, 4 × 200 m freestyle, 4 × 100 m medley
1995 Swedish Swimming Championships: 200 m freestyle, 400 m freestyle, 200 m individual medley, 4 × 200 m freestyle, 4 × 100 m medley
1996 Swedish Swimming Championships: 100 m freestyle, 200 m freestyle, 400 m freestyle, 200 m individual medley, 4 × 200 m freestyle

Swedish Short Course Swimming Championships
1984 Swedish Short Course Swimming Championships: 400 m freestyle, 1500 m freestyle
1985 Swedish Short Course Swimming Championships: 400 m freestyle, 1500 m freestyle
1986 Swedish Short Course Swimming Championships: 400 m freestyle, 4 × 200 m freestyle
1987 Swedish Short Course Swimming Championships: 400 m freestyle
1988 Swedish Short Course Swimming Championships: 200 m freestyle, 400 m freestyle
1989 Swedish Short Course Swimming Championships: 200 m freestyle, 400 m freestyle
1990 Swedish Short Course Swimming Championships: 200 m freestyle, 400 m freestyle
1991 Swedish Short Course Swimming Championships: 200 m freestyle, 400 m freestyle, 200 m individual medley
1992 Swedish Short Course Swimming Championships: 200 m freestyle, 400 m freestyle, 100 m individual medley, 200 m individual medley
1993 Swedish Short Course Swimming Championships: 100 m freestyle, 200 m freestyle, 400 m freestyle, 100 m individual medley
1994 Swedish Short Course Swimming Championships: 100 m freestyle, 200 m freestyle, 400 m freestyle, 4 × 100 m freestyle, 4 × 200 m freestyle, 4 × 100 m medley
1995 Swedish Short Course Swimming Championships: 200 m freestyle, 400 m freestyle, 4 × 100 m freestyle, 4 × 200 m freestyle
1996 Swedish Short Course Swimming Championships: 100 m freestyle, 200 m freestyle, 400 m freestyle
1997 Swedish Short Course Swimming Championships: 100 m freestyle, 400 m freestyle, 4 × 100 m freestyle

See also
World record progression 400 metres freestyle

References

Clubs
Motala SS
Spårvägens SF

1968 births
Living people
People from Motala Municipality
Swedish male medley swimmers
Olympic swimmers of Sweden
Swimmers at the 1984 Summer Olympics
Swimmers at the 1988 Summer Olympics
Swimmers at the 1992 Summer Olympics
Swimmers at the 1996 Summer Olympics
Olympic silver medalists for Sweden
Olympic bronze medalists for Sweden
World record setters in swimming
Olympic bronze medalists in swimming
Swedish male freestyle swimmers
World Aquatics Championships medalists in swimming
Medalists at the FINA World Swimming Championships (25 m)
European Aquatics Championships medalists in swimming
Motala SS swimmers
Spårvägens SF swimmers
Medalists at the 1996 Summer Olympics
Medalists at the 1992 Summer Olympics
Medalists at the 1988 Summer Olympics
Olympic silver medalists in swimming
Sportspeople from Östergötland County